TeleZüri is a local television channel for the city and agglomeration of Zürich, Switzerland. It was founded by Roger Schawinski, a pioneer of local radio. Today it is owned by the Swiss media company CH Media.

TeleZüri features a daily 45-minute-long program, which starts airing at 6 pm. It is repeated hourly. Its daily shows are ZüriNews, ZüriInfo and TalkTäglich. On Fridays the show Lifestyle and on Saturdays the cooking show SwissDinner are aired. On Sundays, some of the most controversial topics of the week are discussed on SonnTalk. The program structure has not changed much since the channel went on air.

The television channel is well known throughout the Swiss youths because of their contributions to the local internet meme culture. Some of their most famous videos include:

- Bombe in Fläsche

- Bin gewesen in Stube, sitze

- Verreis Verreis

- Angst und Geld hani kei

References

External links
 Official site 

1994 establishments in Switzerland
Television stations in Switzerland
German-language television in Switzerland
Organisations based in Zürich
Television channels and stations established in 1994
Mass media in Zürich